The Caproni Ca.113 was an advanced training biplane produced in Italy and Bulgaria in the early 1930s. Designed as a follow-on to the Ca.100, it was a more powerful and robust aircraft capable of aerobatics. It was a conventional design with two cockpits in tandem, single-bay staggered wings of equal span, and mainwheels covered by large spats.

Design and development
The Ca.113's capabilities were demonstrated by Mario De Bernardi's win of the aerobatic trophy at the 1931 Cleveland Air Races with engine Walter Castor and its use in setting a number of aerial records, most importantly a world altitude record of 14,433 m (47,352 ft) set by Renato Donati on 11 April 1934 using a modified Ca.113with longer span wings and powered by a supercharged Alfa-Romeo-built Bristol Pegasus engine. Other records included a women's world altitude record of 12,010 m (39,400 ft) set by Contessa Carina Negrone in 1935, and world endurance records for inverted flight. These latter records were set by Tito Falconi at the US 1933 National Air Races, who flew inverted from Los Angeles to San Diego and after the race meet, made an inverted flight from St. Louis to Chicago.

The Ca.113 was also produced in quantity by the subsidiary that Caproni established in Kazanlak, Bulgaria. Here, it was known as the Chuchuliga ("Skylark") and was produced in a number of versions designated KB-2, KB-3, KB-4 and KB-5 in 1938-1939, some of which were armed. 107 of these aircraft were produced, most going to the Bulgarian Royal Air Force, where they saw service until the country was overrun by the Soviet Union in 1944.

Variants
KB-2UT
Bulgarian training version of Ca.113, with increased dimensions and powered by BMW IV, Junkers L2 or Hispano-Suiza engine. Italian designation of Ca.113/32. Eight built 1933–1935.
KB-2A Chuchuliga
 Revised derivative of KB-2UT, powered by  Walter Castor radial engine. Italian designation of Ca.113/35. Six built 1936.
KB-3 Chuchuliga I
 Improved trainer based on KB-2A, with lightened structure and  Walter Castor II engine. Italian designation Ca.113/36. Twenty built 1937.
KB-4 Chuchuliga II
 Armed reconnaissance/liaison aircraft, powered by  Wright R-975 E-2 Whirlwind. Italian designation Ca.113/39. 28 built 1938–1939.
KB-5 Chuchuliga III
 Reconnaissance/light bomber for Bulgarian Air Force. Prototype powered by  Piaggio P.VII C.I engine, with production aircraft powered by  Walter Pollux II engine. Italian designation Ca.113/40. 45 built 1939–1940.

Operators

Bulgarian Air Force

Peruvian Air Force

Portuguese Air Force - One aircraft

Specifications

See also

References

Bibliography

 
 
 

 
 

Ca.113
1930s Italian civil trainer aircraft
Aerobatic aircraft
Aircraft first flown in 1931
Biplanes
Single-engined tractor aircraft